Denis Gilles Dupéré (June 21, 1948 – April 14, 2019) was a Canadian professional ice hockey left winger. He played for the Toronto Maple Leafs, Washington Capitals, St. Louis Blues, Kansas City Scouts, and Colorado Rockies of the National Hockey League between 1970 and 1978.

Biography 
Dupéré was born in Jonquière, Quebec.

Acquired by the Toronto Maple Leafs from the New York Rangers, Dupéré played four seasons with the Maple Leafs. After being left exposed for the 1974 NHL Expansion Draft, he was claimed by the Washington Capitals. He scored two goals against the Chicago Blackhawks in the Capitals' first win in franchise history. After being named the Capitals' first representative to the NHL All-Star game, he was traded to the St. Louis Blues. The Blues traded him to the Kansas City Scouts the following season, and he would remain with the organization, including after its move to Colorado, until his retirement in 1978. He died from cancer in 2019.

Career statistics

Regular season and playoffs

References

External links

1948 births
2019 deaths
Canadian ice hockey left wingers
Colorado Rockies (NHL) players
French Quebecers
Hampton Gulls (AHL) players
Sportspeople from Saguenay, Quebec
Kansas City Scouts players
Kitchener Rangers players
LHC Les Lions players
Omaha Knights (CHL) players
Philadelphia Firebirds (AHL) players
Rhode Island Reds players
St. Louis Blues players
Toronto Maple Leafs players
Tulsa Oilers (1964–1984) players
Washington Capitals players
Ice hockey people from Quebec
Canadian expatriate ice hockey players in the United States